Víctor Lecumberri (1913–2005) was a Spanish politician.  Known as Commander Otxabiña, he was a communist politician and trade unionist.

Politicians from the Basque Country (autonomous community)
Communist Party of Spain politicians
Spanish communists
People from Eibar
1913 births
2005 deaths